Somali cuisine is the traditional cuisine of Somalis from the Horn of Africa. Somali cuisine does have moderate foreign influence from different countries mainly due to trade but traditionally also varies from region to region due to the expansive landmass Somalis inhabit with traditions varying in different regions which makes it a fusion of differing Somali culinary traditions. It is the product of Somalia's tradition of trade and commerce. Some notable Somali delicacies include Kimis/Sabaayad, Canjeero/Lahoh, Xalwo (Halwa), Sambuusa (Samosa), Bariis Iskukaris, and Muqmad/Odkac.

Pork consumption is forbidden to Muslims in Somalia, in accordance with Sharia, the Islamic law. Among the Somali people, most clans have a taboo against the consumption of fish, and do not intermarry with the few occupational clans that do eat it.

Breakfast
Breakfast (Quraac) is an important meal for Somalis, who often start the day with Somali style tea (shaah/shaax) or coffee (qaxwa).  The tea, brewed from black tea leaves, can be served regularly as-is (shaah rinji or shaah bigays); but it can be also flavoured with spices such as ginger, cardamom and cinnamon (though black pepper is not used unlike other spiced teas) while milk is added after the brewing instead of during it; this is known as shaah cadeys.

The main dish is typically a pancake-like bread called a canjeero or lahoh originating in Somalia and is eaten in different ways. It is often eaten along with Honey and Ghee /Olive oil/Sesame oil and washed down with a cup of Tea. It may also be broken into small pieces with Somali Ghee (Subag) and sugar. For children, it is mixed with tea and Sesame oil/Olive oil (Macsaro) until mushy. Typically there may be a side dish of liver (usually beef), goat meat (hilib ari), diced beef cooked in a bed of soup (suqaar), or odkac, which consists of small dried pieces of beef, goat or camel meat, boiled in ghee.  Different from Ethiopian Injera, Somali Canjeero is smaller, thinner and sweeter. It might also be eaten with a stew (Maraq) or soup.
 Sabaayad or Kimis/Cesh is another type of flatbread which is similar to the Desi Paratha. During lunch, Kimis/Sabaayad is sometimes consumed with Somali Curry, Soup, or Stew.
 Muufo is another type of Somali Flatbread popular within South Somalia and is usually eaten with Stews and Soup but is also sometimes eaten at breakfast with Honey/Sugar, Sesame oil, Subag and Black tea
 Mushaari or Boorash (porridge), with Butter, Nuts and Sugar is eaten across Somalia.
 Nationally, a sweeter and greasy version of Canjeero, similar to a crepe known as Malawax or Malawah is a staple of most home-cooked meals and is usually eaten for breakfast with Tea, similarly to how Canjeero is eaten.

Lunch

Lunch (qado) is often an elaborated main dish of laxoox, pasta (baasto) or rice (Bariis iskukaris) spiced with cumin (kamuun), cardamom (heyl), cloves (dhegayare), and sage (Salvia somalensis). The diffused use of pasta (baasto), such as spaghetti, comes from the Italians. It is frequently presented with a heavier stew than the Italian pasta sauce. As with the rice, it is often served with a banana.

Spaghetti can also be served with rice, forming a novelty dish referred to as "Federation". The dish is usually served with equal (whole) portions of rice and spaghetti, split on either side of a large oval plate. It is then layered with assorted stewed meats and vegetables, served with salad and an optional banana. It has been suggested that the name of the dish is derived from the union of two dishes in Somalia and also from the size and quantity of the food. You will not find this dish served in the average Somali household, since it is uncommon to cook both rice and pasta in one meal. It is instead more common to order the dish from traditional Somali restaurants, where both rice and spaghetti are always readily available. Hence, its novelty status.

In Somalia many people eat some Arab cuisines such as Ful (fava beans) with Kimis or Canjeero, also with Hummus. Other dishes include Falafel with Hummus or are eaten with Pita bread, salad and hummus (like a sandwich).

Another popular dish in the south is iskukaris, a Hot pot (maraq) of rice, vegetables and meat, a national staple. Beyond the many styles of hot pot, rice is usually served with a banana on the side. In Mogadishu, steak (Busteeki) and fish (Kalluun/Mallaay) are widely eaten.

Southern Somalis commonly consume a stiff cornmeal referred to as Soor which is usually eaten alongside Stews or Soup.

Another commonly eaten Cornmeal is eaten called Asida. It is mashed with fresh milk, butter and sugar, or presented with a hole in the middle filled with maraq, or olive oil.

A variation of flat bread is sabaayad/kimis/cesh. Like the rice, is served with maraq and meat on the side. The sabaayad of Somalia is often somewhat sweet, and is cooked in a little oil.

Popular drinks at lunch are balbeelmo (grapefruit), raqey (tamarind) and isbarmuunto (lemonade). In Mogadishu, fiimto (Vimto) and laas (lassi) are also common. In the northwest, the preferred drinks are cambe (mango) (guava) and tufaax (apple).

Bariis iskukaris is also popular, a rice dish cooked and fried with onions, meat, then mixed with a Somali spice mixture called xawaash which contains cumin, coriander, turmeric, cardamon, black pepper, cloves, and nutmeg. It is traditionally served at Somali weddings.

Dinner

Dinner (casho) in Somalia is served as late as 9 pm. During Ramadan, dinnertime often follows Tarawih prayers, sometimes as late as 11 pm. Cambuulo, a common dinner dish, is made from well-cooked azuki beans mixed with butter and sugar. The beans, which on their own are referred to as digir, can take up to five hours to finish cooking when left on the stove at a low temperature. Qamadi (wheat) is also used; cracked or uncracked, it is cooked and served just like the azuki beans.

Rooti iyo xalwo, slices of bread served with a gelatinous confection, is another dinner dish. Muufo, a variation of cornbread, is a dish made of maize and is baked in a tinaar (clay oven). It is eaten by cutting it into small pieces, topped with sesame oil (macsaro) and sugar, then mashed together with black tea.

Before sleeping, a glass of milk spiced with cardamom is often consumed.

Snacks

Sambusa, the Somali variation of the Desi samosa, is a triangular snack that is commonly eaten throughout Somalia during the afur (iftar). Kabaab is a snack eaten in western Somalia. There are several varieties of this dish. For instance, it may be served on sticks or skewers with vegetables. Kebabs are also eaten in Mogadishu. Another common variety consists of minced meat mixed with egg and flour then fried is popular in south Somalia. It resembles kofta kebab. Other snacks eaten include chicken and vegetable filled rolls and bajiyo, which is made from black-eyed peas or azuki beans and is usually served with spicy sauce. These along with samosas are very popular not only during Ramadan but also in special occasions such as weddings and family gatherings. Homemade chips are made with fresh potato and some black pepper. Fruits, such as mango (cambo), guava (seytuun), banana (moos), and orange (liinbanbeelmo) are eaten throughout the day.

Sweets

 Xalwo or halwo (not comparable to the well-known halva) is a popular confection served during special occasions, such as Eid celebrations or wedding receptions. Xalwo is made from sugar, cornstarch, cardamom powder, nutmeg powder, and ghee. Peanuts are also sometimes added to enhance texture and flavor. In the south there is a rice pudding called ruz bil laban. 
 Gashaato, kashaato or qumbe, made from coconut, sugar and oil, which is spiced with cardamom, is a much-loved sweet. The sugar is brought to a boil with a bit of water, then the cardamom is added, followed by shredded coconut. 
 Lows iyo sisin is a favorite sweet in the south. It consists of a mixture of peanuts (lows) and sesame seeds (sisin) in a bed of caramel. The confection sticks together to form a bar. 
 Jallaato, similar to the American ice pop, is made by freezing naturally sweet fruits with a stick in the middle. More recently in Mogadishu (Xamar), it has grown to include caano jallaato, which is made with milk and requires sugaring up. The word jallaato comes from gelato, which is Italian for "frozen".
 Buskut or buskud comprises many different types of cookies, including very soft ones called daardaar (literally "touch-touch" due to its smooth, delicate texture). 
 Doolshe encompasses many styles of cakes.
 Icun is a sweet mostly eaten by southern Somalis. It is made from sugar and flour mixed with oil and is most frequently served at weddings and for Eid.
 Shushumow is a fried Somali pastry with a crystallised shell which is usuallt made as a party snack.
 Basbousa is a traditional Somali sweet cake of Arab influence. It is made from cooked semolina or farina soaked in simple syrup. 
 Also in the north there is lokma, a sweet fried-dough pastry. 
 Baklava is also eaten by some Somalis.

There are many sweets eaten during festive occasions, such as weddings, parties or Eid. Among these are baalbaaloow, shuushuumoow, bur hindi, bur tuug, and qumbe (coconut), the last of which is made from coconuts mixed with sugar to form a bar.

After-meal

Somalis traditionally perfume their homes after meals. Frankincense (luubaan) or a prepared incense (uunsi) is placed on top of hot charcoal inside an incense burner or censer (a dabqaad) or idin. It then burns for about ten minutes. This keeps the house fragrant for hours. The burner is made from soapstone found in specific areas of Somalia.

See also

 Cuisine of the Horn of Africa
 Arab cuisine
 List of African cuisines

Notes

References

External links

 My Somali Food
 Somali Recipes
 Tammy's Somali Home
 The Somali Kitchen
 Xawaash

 
Somali culture
Somali
Cuisine by ethnicity